Family with sequence similarity 18 member B1 (FAM18B1) is the hypothetical protein encoded by the gene LOC51030. Evidence for this protein only exists at the transcript level. The gene is found on  chromosome 17 on the cytogenetic band 17p11.2.

This gene has two paralog in the human genome, LOC201158, which is located on chromosome 17 at 17p12, and TVP23A, which is located on chromosome 16. The duplication appears to have appeared after the MRCA of humans and apes. This gene has homologs in eukaryotes as far back as Trichoplax.

Gene
LOC51030 is highly conserved in chordates and also shows conservation in eukaryotes, including fungi and plants. It is located on Chromosome 17 at 18,684,582-18,710,026, and the most common mRNA has 7 exons.

Protein
This gene encode a protein of 205 amino acids in length and a predicted molecular weight of 23.57 kDa. This protein is predicted to have an isoelectric point of 8.62. It contains a domain of unknown function, DUF846, and a predicted phosphoserine site. It is a multipass transmembrane protein and a member of the FAM18/TVP23 superfamily.

FAM18B1 appears to be ubiquitously expressed in all tissues, health states, and developmental stages to some level. There is also notable expression in bladder tissue.

References